"Not That Funny" is a song by British-American rock band Fleetwood Mac, released in 1980. Composed and sung by guitarist Lindsey Buckingham, it was written as a response to the punk movement in the late 1970s.

Background
Buckingham performed his vocal part on the ground in a push-up position to achieve the desired vocal take. He also insisted on recording the vocals in a replica of his own personal bathroom, which was installed in Studio D of the LA Village Recorder. Engineer and co-producer Ken Caillat taped a microphone to the bathroom's tile floor to satisfy Buckingham's request.

While released as a single in the UK, Germany and the Netherlands, "Not That Funny" was not released elsewhere. Instead, the track's B-Side, "Think About Me", was issued as the third single in North America. Like the singles from Fleetwood Mac's 1975 self-titled release, both singles were slightly remixed for radio. While "Think About Me" reached the Top 30 in both the US and Canada, "Not That Funny" failed to chart at all. Despite the lack of initial success, the song became a live staple at Fleetwood Mac concerts. Played live, the song took on an entirely new arrangement - stretched out to almost nine minutes frequently, the song showcased Buckingham's guitar playing, John McVie's bass playing and featured a solo spot featuring Mick Fleetwood's drumming.  "Not That Funny" has been performed on the Tusk tour, Mirage tour, The Dance tour, and the Live 2013 tour.

For the Tusk tour, the band wanted their keyboard tech, Jeff Sova, to play synthesizers on the song in order to recreate some of the additional sounds heard on the record. However, this idea was dropped as it was interfering with his stage work. Instead, the only keyboard used on the song was a Yamaha console piano, played by Christine McVie.

Critical reception
"Not That Funny" has generally received positive reception. Stephen Holden, a reviewer for Rolling Stone, compared the production of the track to a beautifully recorded basement tape. Another reviewer from Rolling Stone pointed similarities in the guitar work between "Not That Funny" and a Go Insane track, "Loving Cup". Raoul Hernandez of The Austin Chronicle said that "Not That Funny" perfectly demonstrates Buckingham's ability to craft pop/rock songs, and that it reveals the "staleness" of Rumours.

Personnel
Lindsey Buckingham – guitars, vocals, keyboards
Christine McVie – piano
John McVie – bass guitar
Mick Fleetwood – drums

References 

Fleetwood Mac songs
1979 songs
1980 singles
Songs written by Lindsey Buckingham
Song recordings produced by Ken Caillat
Song recordings produced by Richard Dashut
Warner Records singles